Czech Republic competed at the 2018 European Athletics Championships in Berlin, Germany, from 6–12 August 2018. A delegation of 50 athletes were sent to represent the country.

The following athletes were selected to compete by the Czech Athletics Federation.

Medals

Results
 Men 
 Track and road

Field events

Combined events – Decathlon

Women
 Track and road

Field events

Combined events – Heptathlon

References

Nations at the 2018 European Athletics Championships
2018
European Athletics Championships